is a video game developed by Sonic Team and published by Sega. The game was released as a sequel to the previous title, Puyo Pop Fever. The gameplay remains relatively unchanged, but several new modes are introduced. The game features nine different plots, each one pertaining to its three protagonists. Puyo Puyo Fever 2 was released exclusively in Japan for the PlayStation 2 and PlayStation Portable in November 2005, and later for the Nintendo DS the following month.

Gameplay
Unlike Puyo Pop Fever, which uses a simple menu, Puyo Puyo Fever 2 uses a map system to let the player navigate the game's menus. The map system is also reused in the nine courses to show the supposed path of the player's character. Several buildings are available around the map area, known as Primp Town, which was the setting of the previous game. These buildings include a tower for endless modes, a shop to buy items, a town hall to change options and save, a museum for viewing unlocked media and a playground for multiplayer games. You can also explore these areas and talk to the respective characters, where they may distribute items. Items can be used in each course.

The game boasts nine courses, three times that of the previous title. The courses in the game work in much the same fashion as those of the previous game, with the addition of the aforementioned map screen to show the player's route so far.  Each part of the story involves a segment of dialog followed by a Puyo battle, with the exception of the ending sequence of each course.  Gameplay mechanics remain mainly unchanged; however, the aforementioned items system allows the player to perform various different functions.  Common items can be exchanged for points at Oshare Bones' shop.

The game also includes a save system which is not used in any other game to date. It allows three concurrent save files, and lets players save at the beginning of any Puyo battle in story mode, so a player does not have to finish an entire course at once but can stop partway through.

Multiplayer
As in every Puyo Puyo game, this game allows multiplayer, and can support 2 to 8 players in the DS version of the game; other versions can only support up to 4 players. In this mode, players can play as any available character.

Endless modes
There are five endless modes in the game. Three of the endless modes were previously available in Puyo Pop Fever: Endless Fever, Endless Task, and Endless Original. Two new endless modes are also introduced: Endless Battle and Endless Chu Panic. The latter is the only mode in which Chu Puyo appear; Chu Puyo perform the same function as ordinary ojama (garbage, nuisance) puyo, in that they take up space in the player's dungeon and cannot be cleared unless normal puyo are cleared near them. Chu Puyo are heart-shaped and colored pink; chu is Japanese onomatopoeia for kissing.

Plot
The plot of Fever 2 is much more prevalent than it was in the original Fever. The player can choose one of three protagonists: Amitie and Raffina return as the female leads from Fever, with the male lead being new character Sig, a fellow student at the Primp Magic School whose left eye and arm mysteriously turned red shortly before the events of the story take place. The story begins when a visiting wizard and student of the neighboring magic school named Lemres gives a magic book known as the Record of Sealing to a student of Primp Magic named Klug (who was a minor supporting character in Fever) in the hopes that it'll help make him a better mage. However, the Record of Sealing turns out to contain a demon inside of it, who was the previous owner of the book but was sealed away in a misguided prank hundreds of years ago (a group of people bought the Record from a peddler and pranked the book-loving demon by leaving it as a gift for him to read).

The demon possesses Klug, due to him opening the book in close proximity to three artefacts that Lemres was bringing to Accord for safekeeping: the Star Lantern, the Sun Bookmark and the Stone of Moon. It's later revealed that only the "evil" part of the demon was sealed away, and that the "neutral" half of the demon remained unsealed, becoming Sig's ancestor (Sig's extremely placid personality seems to be the result of this, as his ancestor was described in similar terms). No-one notices Klug's bizarre new temperament or appearance due to his know-it-all demeanor alienating him from his classmates, and the demon is resealed by complete accident: Sig and Raffina take the Star Lantern and Stone of Moon from him for entirely personal reasons (Sig takes the Star Lantern to turn his "master" Prince Salde back into a fish to elude his retainer Otomo, while Raffina takes the Stone of Moon because Lemres told her that it has beauty-enhancing properties) with Amitie inadvertently saving Klug's soul by taking the Sun Bookmark back. She then beats up Lemres, unaware that he is the "special guest" that Accord asked Amitie to bring to her. In an attempt to fix this, Accord gives Sig a note and photo of Lemres to give to Amitie. Sig finds Lemres in the deserts around Primp Town before Amitie does, but doesn't read the note on him until he has already beaten Lemres in a Puyo battle. Sig then heals Lemres, but accidentally leaves him there still stuck in the desert. Once Amitie finds out that Lemres is the special guest, she apologizes and helps him get to Accord. Lemres, in pain, says she doesn't need to worry about it, due to his penchant for casually offering candy to everyone he meets. Sig releases Prince Salde into the ocean, only for him to be eaten whole by a whale.

References

External links
 Official Japanese Website
 

2005 video games
Nintendo DS games
PlayStation 2 games
PlayStation Portable games
Puyo Puyo
Sega arcade games
Sega video games
Sonic Team games
Fictional trios
Video game sequels
Japan-exclusive video games
Video games featuring female protagonists
Video games developed in Japan
Multiplayer and single-player video games